"Olha a Explosão" is a song by the Brazilian singer MC Kevinho, released in late 2016, gaining notoriety the following year as a meme. The official music video was released on the official channel of Kondzilla on YouTube and has received over one billion views.

Charts

Wesley Safadão version

"Olha a Explosão" is a forró version of the music of the same name with the Brazilian singer Wesley Safadão. The clip of this version was posted on the official Kondzilla channel on the YouTube.

Olha a Explosão Remix

"Olha a Explosão Remix" is a remix of the song "Olha a Explosão" featuring the singer Nacho and the rappers 2 Chainz and French Montana. The Official Lyric Dance Video was posted on the official Kondzilla channel on YouTube platform.

Certifications

References

2016 songs
Brazilian songs
2 Chainz songs
French Montana songs
Songs written by 2 Chainz
Songs written by French Montana